Zoé De Grand Maison (born May 3, 1995), often credited as Zoé De Grand'Maison or Zoé De Grand-Maison, is a Canadian actress. She is known for her roles of Gracie Johanssen in the television series Orphan Black and Ashley in the movie Bad Hair Day. She recently played Evelyn Evernever on The CW teen drama series Riverdale.

Acting career

2012-present: Orphan Black and Bad Hair Day 
In 2012, Grand Maison made her first television appearance on Saving Hope on CTV Television Network and NBC, where she played Tara. That same year, she played Beth Pelway in the movie An Officer and a Murderer on Lifetime which premiered on July 21, 2012.

In 2013 she played Emily Moreland for four episodes of the Canadian television series Played In May 2014 she made a special appearance in the series Motive in which she played Sasha King. In 2014, Grand Maison joined the recurring cast of the series Orphan Black portraying Gracie Johanssen. 

In March 2015 she played the role of Nicolette Green in the television series Murdoch Mysteries on CBC Television. That same year, she played the antagonistic character Ashley in the movie Bad Hair Day. She also guest starred in an episode of the series Rookie Blue on ABC, where she played Hayley Hill. In 2015, she co-starred in the movie A Christmas Horror Story where she played Molly Simons.

In June 2015, Grand Maison joined the main cast of the film Adam's Testament alongside fellow Canadian actor Luke Bilyk. The movie premiered on April 18, 2017, in Canada. In September 2015, Grand Maison joined the main cast of the film Morning After, playing the role of Teegan when it premiered in Spring 2016.

Grand Maison portrayed the leading role in the telefilm Pregnant At 17 from NB Thrilling Films. The telefilm is about Sonia Clifton (Josie Bissett), a veterinarian who discovers that her husband is having an affair. She becomes obsessed with finding out more about the woman, Chelsea (Grand Maison), and she soon learns that she is 17 and pregnant. Empathizing with the soon-to-be teen mother, Sonia becomes Chelsea's unlikely champion. Released on February 21, 2016 on Lifetime.

Filmography

Films

Television

Awards and nominations

References

External links 

 
 

1995 births
21st-century Canadian actresses
Actresses from Montreal
Canadian child actresses
Canadian film actresses
Canadian television actresses
Living people